Erie is a census-designated place (CDP) in Cass County, North Dakota, United States. The population was 50 at the 2010 census. Established in or after 1980 by the United States Census Bureau, the CDP is named for the village of Erie, which is within its boundary. Although the rectangular boundary includes a sizeable amount of farmland, there is in fact only one residence outside the village's boundary but within that of the CDP.

Geography
Erie is located at  (47.116299, -97.389088).

Demographics

As of the census of 2000, there were 65 people, 29 households, and 18 families residing in the CDP. The population density was 32.6 people per square mile (12.6/km). There were 35 housing units at an average density of 17.6/sq mi (6.8/km). The racial makeup of the CDP was 100.00% White.

There were 29 households, out of which 20.7% had children under the age of 18 living with them, 55.2% were married couples living together, 3.4% had a female householder with no husband present, and 37.9% were non-families. 31.0% of all households were made up of individuals, and 17.2% had someone living alone who was 65 years of age or older. The average household size was 2.24 and the average family size was 2.83.

In the CDP, the population was spread out, with 23.1% under the age of 18, 3.1% from 18 to 24, 16.9% from 25 to 44, 30.8% from 45 to 64, and 26.2% who were 65 years of age or older. The median age was 47 years. For every 100 females, there were 116.7 males. For every 100 females age 18 and over, there were 108.3 males.

The median income for a household in the CDP was $41,250, and the median income for a family was $30,625. Males had a median income of $27,500 versus $18,750 for females. The per capita income for the CDP was $13,165. There were 17.4% of families and 14.6% of the population living below the poverty line, including no under eighteens and none of those over 64.

Education
Erie is divided between Northern Cass Public School District 97 and Hope-Page Public Schools.

References

Census-designated places in Cass County, North Dakota
Census-designated places in North Dakota
Unincorporated communities in North Dakota
Unincorporated communities in Cass County, North Dakota